Scott Alan Shikora, MD FACS (born January 3, 1959) is an American bariatric surgeon. He is currently the Director of the Center for Metabolic and Bariatric Surgery at Brigham and Women’s Hospital and a Professor of Surgery at Harvard Medical School.

Early life 

Shikora was born on January 3, 1959. He attended Muhlenberg College, from which he graduated in 1981.

He graduated from Columbia University College of Physicians & Surgeons in 1985 with a Medical Doctorate. Following medical School, Dr. Shikora completed both his surgical residency and a fellowship in hyperalimentation at the New England Deaconess Hospital in Boston, Massachusetts.

Career 

After completing his fellowship, Shikora spent the next four years in the United States Air Force, where he worked as a staff surgeon. Since 2011, Shikora has been working at Brigham and Women’s Hospital as a bariatric surgeon and Professor of Surgery at Harvard Medical School. Shikora has also worked on advisory boards for several medical companies including Medtronic and EnteroMedics.

He has served on the editorial board for several journals and is currently the Editor-in-chief for the journal Obesity Surgery. Shikora is a former president of the surgical societies the American Society of Parenteral and Enteral Nutrition and the American Society for Metabolic and Bariatric Surgery. He has over 120 publications in various medical journals.

Personal life 

Scott Shikora married his college sweetheart Susan in 1983. They have three children.

Awards and honors 

 John V. Shankweiler Biology Award, Muhlenberg College, 1981
 Meritorious Service Medal, United States Air Force, 1995
 The Air Force Commendation Medal, 1995
 Excellence in Teaching Award, Tufts Medical Center Department of Surgery 2008-2009
 Distinguished Alumni Award, Muhlenberg College, September 2011
 Helen and David Bernie Visiting Professorship - Department of Surgery, Boonshoft School of Medicine, Wright State University, Dayton, Ohio 2014
 Outstanding Achievement Award, ASMBS Foundation, 2015

See also 
 Obesity Surgery
 Bariatric surgery
 List of Scott A. Shikora's Publications

References

External links
Scott Shikora page in Brigham Women's Hospital Directory
Scott Shikora at Brigham Women's Hospital

Living people
1959 births
Muhlenberg College alumni
Columbia University Vagelos College of Physicians and Surgeons alumni
People from Brooklyn
American surgeons
Medical journal editors